The 2022 All Africa Music Awards (also known as AFRIMA) was scheduled to be held on December 8 to 11, 2022. But, it was announced that the ceremony would be held in Dakar, Senegal on January 12 to 15, 2023.

Winners and nominees
The nominations were announced on September 24, 2022. Voting started from September 25, 2022 and ended on January 13, 2023, by popular vote across a pool of 9,067 submitted entries, the most since the first AFRIMA ceremony.

Continental categories

Regional categories

Central Africa

Eastern Africa

Northern Africa

Southern Africa

West Africa

Multiple nominations and awards

By artist
Nominations

By country

References

External links

African music awards
2023 in Senegal